Jawahar Lal Nehru Inter College is a school in Kanpur, Uttar Pradesh, India. It was established in 1968. The college offers intermediate programs in various streams: arts, science and commerce.

Stream provided
Arts
Science
Commerce

Facilities
Physics Lab
Chemistry Lab
Computer Lab
Biology Lab

See also
List of schools in Kanpur

Intermediate colleges in Uttar Pradesh
Schools in Kanpur
Educational institutions established in 1968
1968 establishments in Uttar Pradesh
Monuments and memorials to Jawaharlal Nehru